Anna Ivanova (born ) is a retired Bulgarian female volleyball player. She was part of the Bulgaria women's national volleyball team at the 1998 FIVB Volleyball Women's World Championship in Japan.

References

External links
 todor66.com

1978 births
Living people
Bulgarian women's volleyball players
Place of birth missing (living people)